William Denton may refer to:

William Denton (politician), 16th century English politician and Member of Parliament for Midhurst (UK Parliament constituency)
William Denton (cricketer), early 20th century English cricketer for Northamptonshire
William Denton (physician), 17th century English physician to Charles I and Charles II
Bill Denton, early 20th century American artistic gymnast

See also
William Denton Cox